Peter Sullivan may refer to:

 Peter Sullivan (actor) (born 1963), British actor
 Peter Sullivan (designer) (1932–1996), British graphic designer, The Sunday Times
 Peter Sullivan (ice hockey) (born 1951), Canadian hockey player 
 Peter Sullivan (politician) (born 1967), from Manchester, New Hampshire
 Peter Sullivan (record producer), record producer of the 1960s
 Peter Sullivan (rugby, born 1948), Australian rugby league player and rugby union international captain
 Peter Sullivan (rugby union, born 1998), Irish rugby union player
 Peter Sullivan (screenwriter) (born 1976), American screenwriter, film director and producer
 Peter John Sullivan (1821–1883), American soldier and diplomat

See also
Peter O'Sullivan (disambiguation)